Secret Lives may refer to:

Secret Lives (novel), a 1932 novel by E.F. Benson
Secret Lives (film), a 1937 film from Ealing Studios 
Secret Lives: Hidden Children and Their Rescuers During WWII, a 2002 documentary directed by Aviva Slesin
Secret Lives, 2005 Australian TV film  Duncan Regehr and Ky Furneaux
Secret Lives, 1999 Australian TV series Greg Stevens (writer)
"Secret Lives", song by  Electric Light Orchestra from Balance of Power (album)
Filmworks XI: Secret Lives

See also
 Secret Life (disambiguation)